Basílio Alexandre Neiva de Almeida (born 12 August 1971) is a Portuguese footballer who plays for Grupo Desportivo São Roque as a left winger.

He amassed Primeira Liga totals of 152 games and 22 goals over eight seasons, in representation of Salgueiros  and Vitória de Guimarães. He added 240 matches and 63 goals in the Segunda Liga, in a senior career that spanned nearly three decades.

Club career
Born in Vila Nova de Gaia, Porto District, Almeida started his professional career with Lusitânia F.C. in the third division, where he excelled enough to move straight into the Primeira Liga after signing with S.C. Salgueiros, appearing in only three games in his first season and finishing it on loan to second level club C.D. Feirense.

In the 1995–96 campaign, Basílio scored eight goals in 27 matches, helping Salgueiros easily avoid relegation by ranking in 12th position. In summer 1996 he joined Vitória S.C. but, after three years in which he failed to impress, he returned to his previous team, going on to compete three of four seasons in the Portuguese top flight.

After leaving the Paranhos side in 2003, at the age of 32, Basílio went on to represent a host of clubs, retiring well into his 40s in the regional championships.

References

External links

1971 births
Living people
Sportspeople from Vila Nova de Gaia
Portuguese footballers
Association football wingers
Primeira Liga players
Liga Portugal 2 players
Segunda Divisão players
Lusitânia F.C. players
S.C. Salgueiros players
C.D. Feirense players
Vitória S.C. players
F.C. Maia players
Associação Naval 1º de Maio players
C.D. Santa Clara players
S.C. Covilhã players